Chrodbert (also known as Chrodbert II or Robert II to distinguish him from his grandfather known sometimes as Chrodbert I) (died after 678) was a nobleman from Neustria.  He was grandson to Chrodbert I, referendary to Clovis II through Chrodbert's son Lambert of Hesbaye (died after 650). Chrodbert was Lord Chancellor during the reign of Chlothar III, King of the Franks in Neustria, as well as referendary. He was a contemporary of Ansbert of Rouen, who was also a Lord Chancellor to Clotaire III.  Chrodbert was mentioned as Count palatine (comes palatinus) on 2 October 678.

He was at the court of Clovis II in 654 and opposed Erchinoald, Mayor of the Palace, to little avail.  He supported Ebroin against Leodegar, who had the latter’s eyes put out.  He became Count palatine and then chancellor to Clothar III.

Chrodbert married Théodrade (Théoda) and they had many children, some of which are likely their grandchildren
 Chariivius (Hervé), Nobleman of Hesbaye (some say Count of Laon)
 Lambert II, Count of Hesbaye
 Rupert of Salzburg, Bishop of Worms
 Chrotgar, Duke of Le Mans, whose son Charivius has been speculated to have been an ancestor of the Rorgonids
 Ragobert (d. 678)
 Folchaid, married Theodo of Bavaria.

Settipani identifies the first four of these children as the sons of an unnamed son of Chrodbert.  However, given the status of these individuals, it seems unlikely that their father would have remained unknown. Grimbert, Count palatine, is credited as being a son of Chrodbert although there is little evidence to support that. Some histories show Lambert, Count of Hesbaye, as son of Chrodbert, others as the son of Hervé.  Chrodbert is typically viewed in scholarly reconstructions to have been a direct ancestor of the Robertians who ruled France from the ninth century.

References

Bibliography 
Settipani, Christian, Les Ancêtres de Charlemagne, Paris, 1989
Settipani, Christian, "Addendum to the Ancestors of Charlemagne"
Gerberding, Richard A., The Rise of the Carolingians and the Liber Historiae Francorum, Oxford University Press, 1987
Claussen, M. A., The Reform of the Frankish Church: Chrodegang of Metz and the Regula Canonicorum in the Eighth Century, Cambridge University Press, 2004

French nobility
7th-century deaths